Clyde V. Lee (February 11, 1908 – December 12, 1995) was an American football player and coach. He served as the head football coach at the University of Houston from 1948 to 1954, guiding the Cougars to a 37–32–2 record. Lee played his college career at Centenary College from 1930 to 1932 under Homer Norton. Among his college teammates was Lovette Hill, who later served as his colleague at Houston on his coaching staff and as head baseball coach for the school.

After his college playing career, Lee served as head coach for several sports including football to Overton High School in Overton, Texas. He was paid $90 a month, taught five math classes, a history class, and coached for four sports without an assistant. In three seasons, his record was 28–3–2. Lee then moved into his first college coaching job as head coach for Kilgore College where he compiled a 57–10–5 record before entering the United States Navy. Upon leaving the armed services, he coached at the University of Tulsa under Buddy Brothers for two years.

At Houston, Lee was credited with improving the strength of the Cougars' schedules. This began during the 1949 season, when Houston played its first major opponent, William & Mary. He led the Cougars to their first bowl game berth, to the 1952 Salad Bowl, and a Missouri Valley Conference (MVC) championship in 1952. During his first season, fewer than 100 season tickets were sold by the Cougars, but by 1952, over 10,000 were sold.

After retiring from coaching, Lee moved to Freeport, Texas, and became a regular at Cougars home games. He died on December 12, 1995, at Plantation Health Care Center in Lake Jackson, Texas.

Head coaching record

Junior college

College

References

External links
 

1908 births
1995 deaths
American football ends
Centenary Gentlemen baseball players
Centenary Gentlemen football players
Houston Cougars football coaches
Tulsa Golden Hurricane football coaches
High school football coaches in Texas
Junior college football coaches in the United States
People from Freeport, Texas
People from Freestone County, Texas
Coaches of American football from Texas
Players of American football from Texas
Baseball players from Texas